Sidiclei de Souza (born 13 May 1972 in Cascavel, Brazil), simply known as Sidiclei, is a Brazilian football player.

Sidiclei previously played for Atletico Paranaense in the Copa do Brasil.

Sidiclei captained for Gamba Osaka in 2005 and Kyoto Sanga FC in 2009.
He is considered one of the most successful foreign players in Japan, and was seen as a cult figure amongst the supporters.

He is also famous in 2channel by the phrase "Too bad, Sidiclei is there", an allegory of his great skill of defending, especially anticipation.

Club statistics

References

External links

1972 births
Living people
Brazilian footballers
J1 League players
J2 League players
Japan Football League (1992–1998) players
Club Athletico Paranaense players
Montedio Yamagata players
Kyoto Sanga FC players
Oita Trinita players
Vissel Kobe players
Gamba Osaka players
Expatriate footballers in Japan
Brazilian expatriate footballers
People from Cascavel
Association football defenders
Sportspeople from Paraná (state)